Bruno Kreisky (22 January 1911 – 29 July 1990) was an Austrian social democratic politician who served as Foreign Minister from 1959 to 1966 and as Chancellor from 1970 to 1983. Aged 72 at the end of his chancellorship, he was the oldest Chancellor after World War II. His 13-year tenure was the longest of any Chancellor in republican Austria.

With his 13-year chancellorship, known as the Kreisky era, he is one of the most important political figures in the country as well as in Western European social democracy. Partly at the same time as him, the Social Democrats Willy Brandt of West Germany and Olof Palme of Sweden were heads of government, with whom he worked closely in the Socialist International.

Life and political career 
Kreisky was born in Margareten, a district of Vienna, to a non-observant Jewish family. His parents were Max Kreisky (1876, Klattau – 1944) and Irene Kreisky née Felix (1884, Třebíč – 1969). His father worked as a textile manufacturer. Shocked by the level of poverty and violence in Austria during the 1920s, he joined the youth wing of the Socialist Party of Austria (SPÖ) in 1925 at age 15. In 1927, he joined the Young Socialist Workers against the wishes of his parents. In 1929, he began studying law at the University of Vienna at the advice of Otto Bauer, who urged him to study law rather than medicine, as he had originally planned. He remained politically active during this period. In 1931, he left the Jewish religious community, becoming agnostic. In 1934, when the Socialist Party was banned by the Dollfuss dictatorship, he became active in underground political work. He was arrested in January 1935 and convicted of high treason, but was released in June 1936. In March 1938 the Austrian state was incorporated into Germany through the Anschluss, and in September Kreisky escaped the Nazi persecution of Austrian Jews and the coming Holocaust by emigrating to Sweden, where he remained until 1945. On 23 April 1942, he married Vera Fürth (30 December 1916 – 5 December 1988) and had one son and one daughter.

He returned to Austria in May 1946, but he was soon back in Stockholm, assigned to the Austrian legation. In 1951, he returned to Vienna, where Federal President Theodor Körner appointed him Assistant Chief of Staff and political adviser. In 1953, he was appointed Undersecretary in the Foreign Affairs Department of the Austrian Chancellery and in this position he took part in negotiating the 1955 Austrian State Treaty, which ended the four-power occupation of Austria and restored Austria's independence and neutrality.

Kreisky was elected to the Austrian parliament, the Nationalrat, as a Socialist during the 1956 election. He was elected to the Party Executive along with Bruno Pittermann, Felix Slavik, and Franz Olah, and thus became a member of the central leadership body of the party. After the 1959 election, he became Foreign Minister in the coalition cabinet of Chancellor Julius Raab (ÖVP), a post he continued to hold under Raab's successors Alfons Gorbach (1961–1964) and Josef Klaus (1964–1966). He played a leading role in setting up the European Free Trade Association, helped solve the South Tyrol question with Italy, and proposed a "Marshall Plan" for the countries of the Third World.

In 1966, the ÖVP under Klaus won an absolute majority in the Nationalrat. Klaus had enough parliamentary support to govern alone; indeed, during the campaign he had called for an end to the grand coalition that had governed Austria since 1945. However, memories of the hyperpartisanship that characterized the First Republic were still very strong, and he approached Kreisky with new coalition terms. While Kreisky and the other Socialist leadership supported retaining the coalition, the rank and file balked at the proposed terms, and talks broke down. Kreisky resigned from cabinet, and the ÖVP formed the first one-party government of the Second Republic. However, the Socialists were not completely shut out of power; they were informally consulted on all major decisions.In February 1967, Kreisky was elected chairman of the Socialist Party. At the March 1970 elections, the Socialists won 81 seats, two short of a majority. Kreisky became the first Socialist Chancellor since 1920, heading the first purely left-wing government in modern Austrian history. He was also Austria's first Jewish Chancellor. Kreisky's government was tolerated by the then national-liberal Freedom Party in return for electoral reforms that expanded the Nationalrat and increased the proportionality of votes. Following the passage of these reforms, he called fresh elections in October 1971. Although the reforms were intended to benefit smaller parties, the Socialists won a strong majority government with 93 seats. They also won half the popular vote, something no Austrian party had ever achieved in a free election. Kreisky was reelected in 1975 and 1979 elections, each time winning comfortable majorities in the Nationalrat.

Kreisky turned 70 in 1981, and by this time the voters had become increasingly uncomfortable with what they saw as his complacency and preoccupation with international issues. At the 1983 election, the Socialists lost their absolute majority in the Nationalrat. Kreisky declined to form a minority government and resigned, nominating Fred Sinowatz, his Minister of Education, as his successor. His health was declining, and in 1984 he had an emergency kidney transplant. During his final years he occasionally made bitter remarks directed at his party, who had made him their honorary chairman. He died in Vienna in July 1990.

Political views and programs 

In office, Kreisky and his close ally, Justice Minister Christian Broda, pursued a policy of liberal reform, in a country which had a tradition of conservative Roman Catholicism. He reformed Austria's family law and its prisons, and he decriminalized abortion and homosexuality. Nevertheless, he sought to bridge the gap between the Catholic Church and the Austrian Socialist movement and found a willing collaborator in the then Cardinal Archbishop of Vienna, Franz König. Kreisky promised to reduce the mandatory military service from nine to six months. After his election, military service was reduced to eight months (if performed in one stretch, or six months plus eight weeks if broken into two segments).

During Kreisky's premiership, a wide range of progressive reforms was carried out. Amongst other reforms, employee benefits were expanded, the workweek was cut to 40 hours, and legislation providing for equality for women was passed. Kreisky's government established language rights for the country's Slovene and Croatian minorities. Following the 1974 oil shock, Kreisky committed Austria to developing nuclear power to reduce dependence on fossil fuels, although this policy was eventually abandoned after a referendum held in 1978. A moderate reform of the penal code was carried out, discrimination against illegitimate children was eliminated, marriage grants were introduced, mother-child pass (a pre-natal/post-natal care and infant health program) was established, a major reform of the penal code was carried out, and sex equality legislation was passed. In addition, four weeks of annual vacation were introduced, the office of ombudsman was established, the law of parentage was reordered, consumer protection legislation was passed, and social security coverage of the self-employed was introduced. In 1979, restrictions on redundancy and the dismissal of employees were made.

Widows' pensions were indexed in 1970, and in 1972, free medical checks for healthy people were made available, while optional health insurance for students was introduced. Periods of study, illness, and unemployment were allowed pensionable status, and in 1974 family and birth benefits were indexed. The 1973 Special Subsidies Act introduced subsidies for those made redundant as a result of structural changes. The Wage Continuation Act of 1974 introduced wage continuation for workers in private enterprises in cases of sickness. In 1976, accident insurance was extended to work-related activities. The Night-shift/Heavy Manual Work Act of 1981 introduced preventive healthcare and a special early retirement pension for heavy manual workers.

Full sick pay was extended to blue-collar unions in 1974, and family benefits were expanded to include full school transport (1971), a marriage payment (1972), payment for school books (1974), and a birth payment (1976). In 1978, due to a change from tax allowances to direct payments for children, family benefits increased significantly. Between 1973 and 1980, expenditure on health and education rose on average by 13.7% and by 12.9% per annum respectively. In education, pupil/teacher ratios fell sharply and a new university law was passed in 1975 in order to make higher education more democratic. The educational sector was significantly expanded under Kreisky, greatly increasing the numbers of Austrians receiving a university education.

The 1972 Crime Victims Act established the principles of compensation for health damages caused (directly or indirectly) by crimes punishable by more than 6 months' imprisonment. The 1974 Town Renovation Act dealt with the renovation of residential town areas, while the 1975 Housing Property Act established the property rights of house- and flat-owners. In 1975, housing supplements were extended to cover costs of housing improvements. In 1974, the work prohibiting periods before and after work birth were extended up to 8 weeks, and in 1976 the regulations were extended to adoptive mothers. A 1981 law adapted pension schemes to changes in the families' loads equalization scheme, and introduced a widowers' pension equivalent to the widows' pension. In 1976, accident insurance for pupils and students was introduced, while an act passed that same year enabled people to undertake the care of close relatives who were ill. Under the Bankruptcy Wage Continuation Act of 1979, claims against bankrupt firms were paid from a special fund. In 1982, a maternity allowance payable for 16 weeks was introduced for self-employed women.

Kreisky played a prominent role in international affairs, promoting dialogue between North Korea and South Korea, and working with like-minded European leaders such as Willy Brandt and Olof Palme to promote peace and development. Although the 1955 State Treaty prevented Austria from joining the European Union, he supported European integration. Austria cast itself as a bridge between East and West, and Vienna was the site for some early rounds of the Strategic Arms Limitation Talks between the United States and the Soviet Union.

Kreisky questioned Zionism as a solution to the problems faced by the Jewish people, claiming that Jews were not an ethnic group or race, but rather a religious group. He even equated claims of the existence of the Jewish people as a distinctive nationality to Nazi claims of a Jewish race, and suggested that such ideas raised questions about Jewish dual loyalty. However, he did not oppose the existence of Israel or question the legitimacy of Israeli patriotism, and developed friendly relations with the Israeli Labor Party and the Peace Now movement, though he harshly criticized the Israeli right-wing and the Likud party as fascists. Kreisky referred to Israeli Prime Minister Menachem Begin as a terrorist, and had a stormy relationship with Israeli Prime Minister Golda Meir especially during the 1973 hostage taking. He once said that he was "the only politician in Europe Golda Meir can't blackmail." He cultivated friendly relations with Arab leaders such as Anwar Sadat and Muammar Gaddafi, and in 1980 Austria established relations with the Palestine Liberation Organisation. He tried to use his position as a European Jewish Socialist to act as a mediator between Israel and the Arabs.

Kreisky was notable for his allegedly apologetic approach to former Nazi party members and contemporary far-right Austrian politicians. For example, Kreisky described far-right populist Jörg Haider as "a political talent worth watching". Kreisky is alleged to have used coded anti-Semitic language to attract right-wing voters in Austria. In 1967, neo-Nazi Austrian leader Norbert Burger declared that he had no objections to Kreisky despite his Jewish background, claiming that he was simply a "German" and neither a religious Jew nor a Zionist. Kreisky felt that he had never personally suffered as a Jew, but only as a socialist. While imprisoned for his socialist activities during the Dollfuss regime, many of his cellmates were active Nazis, and Kreisky accepted them as fellow political opponents. Following his election in 1970, Kreisky wanted to demonstrate that he was indeed "Chancellor of all Austrians", and appointed four politicians with Nazi backgrounds to his cabinet. When Nazi hunter Simon Wiesenthal reported that four members of Kreisky's cabinet were former Nazis, Kreisky did not remove them from the government, though one did resign. Kreisky responded that everybody had the right to make political mistakes in their youth. This incident marked the beginning of a bitter conflict, which did not end until Kreisky died. In 1986, Wiesenthal sued Kreisky for libel. Three years later the court found Kreisky guilty of defamation and forced him to pay a substantial fine.

In 1976, the Bruno Kreisky Foundation for Outstanding Achievements in the Area of Human Rights was founded to mark Kreisky's 65th birthday. Every two years, the Bruno Kreisky Human Rights Prize is awarded to an international figure who has advanced the cause of human rights.

Later in his life Kreisky tried to help some Soviet dissidents. In particular, in 1983 he sent a letter to the Soviet premier Yuri Andropov demanding the release of dissident Yuri Orlov, but Andropov left Kreisky's letter unanswered.

Legacy 
Today, Kreisky's chancellorship is the subject of both controversy and nostalgia. Many of his former supporters see in Kreisky the last socialist of the old school and look back admiringly at an era when the standard of living was noticeably rising, when the welfare state was in full swing and when, by means of a state-funded programme promoting equality of opportunity, working class children were encouraged to stay on at school and eventually receive higher education. All this resulted in a decade of prosperity and optimism about the future.

Conservatives criticize Kreisky's policy of deficit spending, expressed in his famous comment during the 1979 election campaign that he preferred that the state run up high debts rather than see people become unemployed. They hold Kreisky responsible for Austria's subsequent economic difficulties.

Despite this criticism, Kreisky did much to transform Austria during his time in office, with considerable improvements in working conditions, a dramatic rise in the average standard of living, and a significant expansion of the welfare state, and arguably remains the most successful socialist Chancellor of Austria.

See also 
 Chancellor of Austria for a complete list of Federal Chancellors since the founding of the Republic in 1918
 Kreisky-Peter-Wiesenthal affair

References

Further reading
 Bischof, Günter, and Anton Pelinka, eds. The Kreisky Era in Austria (Transaction publishers, 1994).
 Kreisky, Bruno, et al. The struggle for a democratic Austria: Bruno Kreisky on peace and social justice (Berghahn Books, 2000).
 Secher, H. Pierre. Bruno Kreisky, chancellor of Austria: a political biography (Dorrance Publ., 1993).
 Vivekanandan, Bhagavathi. Global Visions of Olof Palme, Bruno Kreisky and Willy Brandt: International Peace and Security, Co-operation, and Development (Springer, 2016).

 Wilsford, David, ed. Political leaders of contemporary Western Europe: a biographical dictionary (Greenwood, 1995) pp. 259–65

External links 

 The Bruno Kreisky Foundation
 Kreisky's dicta
 The Kreisky Years
 100 Years Bruno Kreisky For the 100'th Birthday of Bruno Kreisky – Overview about his political work

|-

|-

1911 births
1990 deaths
20th-century Chancellors of Austria
People from Margareten
People from Wieden
Austrian Ministers of Defence
Chancellors of Austria
Foreign ministers of Austria
Austrian diplomats
Austrian expatriates in Sweden
University of Vienna alumni
People convicted of treason against Austria
Jewish Austrian politicians
Jewish prime ministers
Austrian Jews
Austrian people of Czech-Jewish descent
Jewish agnostics
Austrian agnostics
Presidents of the Organising Committees for the Olympic Games
Burials at the Vienna Central Cemetery
Grand Crosses 1st class of the Order of Merit of the Federal Republic of Germany
Recipients of the Order of the White Lion